Mohamed Hammad (born 11 July 1963) is a Sudanese boxer. He competed in the men's super heavyweight event at the 1988 Summer Olympics.

References

1963 births
Living people
Super-heavyweight boxers
Sudanese male boxers
Olympic boxers of Sudan
Boxers at the 1988 Summer Olympics
People from South Kordofan